, together with its companion case ParkingEye Ltd v Beavis, are English contract law cases concerning the validity of penalty clauses and (in relation to ParkingEye Ltd v Beavis) the application of the Unfair Terms in Consumer Contracts Directive. The UK Supreme Court ruled on both cases together on 4 November 2015, updating the established legal rule on penalty clauses and replacing the test of whether or not a disputed clause is "a genuine pre-estimate of loss" with a test asking whether it imposed a proportionate detriment in relation to any "legitimate interest" of the innocent party.

Commentators on the ruling have noted that "these cases provide some welcome clarification to the law in this area".

Facts

Cavendish Square Holding BV v Makdessi
In Makdessi, because the issue of penalty clauses had been taken as a preliminary issue, the appeal was heard on the basis of an agreed set of facts (the court having not yet heard evidence or made any determinations). The agreed facts were summarised in the judgment of Lord Mance:

It was accepted by Mr El Makdessi for the purposes of the case that he did subsequently breach clause 11.2, and was thereby also in breach of his fiduciary duties. The proceedings were initiated by both Cavendish and the main holding company. The holding company's claim (for breach of fiduciary duty) was settled in October 2012 when it accepted a Part 36 payment of US$500,000 made by Mr El Makdessi. Cavendish's claim was for declarations that Mr El Makdessi's breach of clause 11.2 means that clauses 5.1 and 5.6 now have the effect stated. Mr El Makdessi argued that they were unenforceable penalty clauses.

ParkingEye Limited v Beavis
In ParkingEye, the appellant, Mr Beavis, was the owner and driver of a vehicle which he parked in a retail shopping car park adjacent to Chelmsford railway station. The owner of the retail site and car park, British Airways Pension Fund (BAPF), had contracted ParkingEye Ltd, the respondent, to provide "a traffic space maximisation scheme". The scheme involved the erection at the entrance to and throughout the car park of prominent notices, including the statements "2 hour max stay" and "Parking limited to 2 hours", coupled with the further notice "Failure to comply ... will result in a Parking Charge of £85". Underneath, it also stated: "By parking within the car park, motorists agree to comply with the car park regulations". Mr Beavis left his car parked for 56 minutes over the permitted two-hour period. He argued that the £85 charge demanded of him by ParkingEye (reducible to £50 if he had paid within 14 days) was an unenforceable penalty. Further or alternatively, he maintained that it was unfair and invalid within the meaning of the Unfair Terms in Consumer Contracts Regulations 1999.

Judgment

The Supreme Court held by a majority (Lord Toulson dissenting in the ParkingEye case) that the provisions in the Cavendish case were not penalties, and in ParkingEye that the charge was not an unlawful penalty or contrary to the 1999 Regulations or the Unfair Terms in Consumer Contracts Directive.

Lord Sumption and Lord Neuberger gave the first opinion jointly.

Lord Mance gave a concurring opinion.

Lord Hodge gave a concurring opinion, noting that he was "initially in some doubt" about the ParkingEye case.

Lord Clarke concurred with Lord Sumption, Lord Neuberger, Lord Mance and Lord Hodge.

Lord Toulson dissented, and would have held that the £85 charge was unlawful.

Significance
Commentators on the decision have noted that "these cases provide some welcome clarification to the law in this area", and that going forward "it seems that where parties have negotiated a contract, on a level playing field and with the assistance of professional advisors, it will now be much harder for the party paying liquidated damages to challenge the validity of those provisions on the basis that they are a penalty." Others have suggested that "in deciding to abandon the admittedly over-rigid categorisation of penalty clauses in Dunlop the Supreme Court has, in the course of explaining and updating the law in this fascinating decision, created some uncertainty in the commercial world."

Other impacts on equitable relief
In Shiloh Spinners Ltd v Harding, the House of Lords had held that the equitable remedy of relief from forfeiture was not "confined to any particular type of case". The Judicial Committee of the Privy Council subsequently affirmed that principle in Cukurova Finance International Ltd v Alfa Telecom Turkey Ltd, declaring "that relief from forfeiture is available in principle where what is in question is forfeiture of proprietary or possessory rights, as opposed to merely contractual rights, regardless of the type of property concerned". In Cavendish, the Supreme Court has extended relief to contractual provisions, such as forfeiture clauses, as noted by Lord Hodge:

This can be construed to hold that relief is available to circumvent the effect of time bar provisions that exist in some contracts, which can contain onerous notice provisions.

See also
Dunlop Pneumatic Tyre Co Ltd v New Garage & Motor Co Ltd

European Union law
English contract law

References

English contract case law
2015 in British law
Supreme Court of the United Kingdom cases
2015 in case law